Mazaeras mediofasciata is a moth of the family Erebidae first described by James John Joicey and George Talbot in 1916. It is found in Peru.

References

Moths described in 1916
Phaegopterina